Dipodium ensifolium, commonly known as leafy hyacinth-orchid, is an orchid species that is endemic to north-east Queensland. It has sword-shaped leaves and up to twenty pink to mauve flowers with purplish spots and blotches.

Description
The sepals and petals are free from each other and spread widely apart. Flowering occurs between October and February.

Taxonomy and naming
Dipodium ensifolium was formally described in 1865 by Ferdinand von Mueller from a specimen collected on rocky mountains near Rockingham Bay. The specific epithet (ensifolium) is derived from the Latin words ensis meaning "sword" and folium meaning "leaf".

Distribution and habitat
The leafy hyacinth orchid grows in forest and woodland between Cooktown and Ingham. Plants develop long, lanky growths except when above ground parts are destroyed by fire, when they quickly produce new growth.

Ecology
The flowers of this orchid are pollinated by small native bees.

Use in horticulture
This orchid is easily grown in pots in warm climates and bright light.

References

ensifolium
Orchids of Queensland
Plants described in 1865
Taxa named by Ferdinand von Mueller